William Columbus Preston (May 6, 1893 – December 25, 1954) was an American football player.

Preson was born in 1893 on a farm in Dade County, Missouri.  He played college football for the University of Missouri. He played  for the team in 1915 and 1916. 

Preston moved to Akron, Ohio, as a cost inspector for dirigibles. He served in the Navy during World War I. After the war, he was employed in the building business in Akron. He then joined the Portage Ruber Co. 

While living in Akron, he played one game of professional football for the Akron Pros of the American Professional Football Association (APFA).  His one game was the opening game on October 3, 1920, against a club from Wheeling, West Virginia, that was not affiliated with the APFA. Preston appeared in the game as a substitute at the left tackle position. Preston "left the squad" after the Wheeling game. 

Preston became employed by the Mututal Benefit Life Insurance Co. in 1931 and became a general agent for the company in 1936.  He moved to Ghent, Ohio, in 1946. He died in 1954 after trying to extinguish a fire at his home on Christmas Day. He was age 61 when he died.

References

1893 births
1954 deaths
American football tackles
Akron Pros players
Missouri Tigers football players